Gaustadt is a district of Bamberg, Upper Franconia in Germany. In Gaustadt there is a brewery called Brauerei Kaiserdom (Brewery Kaiserdom).

History 
Gaustadt has a population of about 6,500. Since 1972, Gaustadt is not an independent small town anymore, but instead became part of the City of Bamberg through a plebiscite.

Towns in Bavaria